Events from the year 1821 in Ireland.

Events
12 August – 3 September: the newly crowned King George IV of the United Kingdom lands at Howth to become the first monarch to pay a state visit to Ireland since the 14th century. He stays at the Viceregal Lodge in Dublin; with his mistress Elizabeth Conyngham, Marchioness Conyngham, at Slane Castle; and with Viscount Powerscourt at Powerscourt House. He departs from Dunleary which is renamed Kingstown in his honour.
September–November – potato crop fails.
28 December – Sandycove lifeboat disaster – four lifeboatmen drown attempting to rescue Ellen of Liverpool.
Metal Man seamark erected at Rosses Point.
Loreto Abbey established by Sisters of Loreto at Rathfarnham.

Arts and literature
18 January – the Albany New Theatre opens in Dublin. In August, King George IV attends a performance, following which it becomes Dublin's second Theatre Royal.
John Banim's poem The Celt's Paradise is published, and his play Damon and Pythias is first performed (at the Theatre Royal, Covent Garden) on 28 May.
Whitely Stokes publishes a critique of Thomas Malthus's reflections on Ireland: Observations on the population and resources of Ireland, Dublin, Joshua Porter

Births
20 January – Dennis Mahony, co-founder of the Herald newspaper in Dubuque, Iowa (died 1879 in the United States).
February (possible date) – Robert O'Hara Burke, explorer of Australia (died 1861 in Australia).
17 February – Lola Montez, born Eliza Rosanna Gilbert, "Spanish dancer" and royal mistress (died 1861 in the United States).
20 February – Miles Gerard Keon, journalist, novelist, colonial secretary and lecturer (died 1875).
21 February – "Roaring" Hugh Hanna, Evangelical preacher (died 1892).
8 March – James Sheridan Muspratt, research chemist and teacher (died 1871).
28 March – William Howard Russell, journalist (died 1907).
6 May – Robert O'Hara Burke, explorer of Australia (died 1861 in Australia).
20 July – Michael Hannan, Archbishop in Roman Catholic Archdiocese of Halifax, Nova Scotia (died 1882 in Canada).
22 September – John Conness, United States Senator from California, 1863–1869 (died 1909 in the United States).
18 December – William Connor Magee, Anglican clergyman, Archbishop of York (died 1891).
21 December – Samuel Haughton, scientific writer (died 1897).
27 December – Jane Francesca Elgee, later Lady Wilde, poet ("Esperanza"; died 1896).
Date unknown – Joseph Robinson Kirk, sculptor (died 1894).

Deaths
6 April – Robert Stewart, 1st Marquess of Londonderry, politician (born 1739).
15 June – James Cuffe, 1st Baron Tyrawley, peer (born 1747).
4 October – Edward Hudson, dentist (born 1743).
15 November – John Barrett, clergyman and Hebrew scholar (born 1753).

References

 
Years of the 19th century in Ireland
1820s in Ireland
Ireland
 Ireland